Nicholas Lionel Majendie (born 9 June 1942 in Cheltenham) is a former English first-class cricketer who played for Oxford University and Surrey. He is now an investment manager in Canada.

Life and career
Nick Majendie was educated at Winchester College, where he played cricket for the school, and at Christ Church, Oxford. After appearing in a few matches for Surrey in 1963, he was named by the Test player Colin Cowdrey as one of the most promising young players in England: "[he did] enough to raise every eyebrow, for nothing eluded him and his obvious class became apparent to all". However, Majendie played no further first-class cricket after the 1963 season.

After receiving an MA from Oxford, Majendie moved to Canada in 1964. He became a chartered accountant with Price Waterhouse in 1967, and in 1969 entered the investment business as a research analyst. Since then he has run his own investment companies. Among other positions, he is a Director of Canaccord Genuity Corporation and Majendie Wealth Management. He is also a frequent investment commentator in the media.

References

1942 births
Living people
English cricketers
Surrey cricketers
Oxford University cricketers
Sportspeople from Cheltenham
People educated at Winchester College
Alumni of Christ Church, Oxford
Canadian investors